St. Luke's Church, is a historic Episcopal church located in Baltimore, Maryland, United States. It is a Gothic Revival-style church that follows the dictates of the Ecclesiological Society reflecting English medieval building principles. It is composed of a tall nave, flanked by side aisles below a clerestory, and features a crenelated tower with lancet windows. Rose windows exist at the west end of the nave and along the clerestory.  It was the largest Episcopal church in Baltimore upon its completion in 1851.

St. Luke's Church was listed on the National Register of Historic Places in 1973.

References

External links
, including undated photo, at Maryland Historical Trust

Churches completed in 1851
19th-century Episcopal church buildings
Episcopal church building in Baltimore
Properties of religious function on the National Register of Historic Places in Baltimore
Gothic Revival church buildings in Maryland
1851 establishments in Maryland
Poppleton, Baltimore
Churches on the National Register of Historic Places in Maryland